RX5 is a studio album by the rock band The Alvin Lee Band, released in 1981.

Critical reception
People praised the album, writing that it "recaptures the dizzying incandescence found only on the very finest albums of pure rock ... The power chords and lightning runs seem to uncoil from Lee’s smoking ax." Billboard called it a "strong effort" on which "the energy level remains high from first cut to last."

Track listing
All tracks composed by Steve Gould; except where noted
 "Hang On" – 3:46 
 "Lady Luck" – 3:04 
 "Can't Stop" (Alvin Lee) – 5:09 
 "Wrong Side of the Law" (Dek Rootham, Dave Robson) – 3:10 
 "Nutbush City Limits" (Tina Turner) – 3:50 
 "Rock 'N' Roll Guitar Picker" (Alvin Lee) – 3:05 
 "Double Loser" (Alvin Lee) – 2:55 
 "Fool No More" (Steve Gould, Mick Feat) – 5:10 
 "Dangerous World" – 3:40 
 "High Times" – 5:25

Personnel
Alvin Lee - guitar, vocals
Steve Gould - guitar, vocals
Mickey Feat - bass guitar, vocals
Tom Compton - drums, percussion
Chris Stainton - keyboards

Artwork
 The album's artwork was made by Derek Riggs, who is famous for his work with Iron Maiden.

References

Alvin Lee albums
1981 albums
Jugoton albums